The Drummond Business Block is located in Eau Claire, Wisconsin. It was added to the National Register of Historic Places in 2007.

History
The building was constructed in three phases from 1879 to 1884. It had been built by Canadian immigrant David Drummond for his meat packing business. The building serves in a mixture of manufacturing, specialty and residential capacities.

References

Commercial buildings on the National Register of Historic Places in Wisconsin
Buildings and structures in Eau Claire, Wisconsin
Commercial buildings completed in 1884
National Register of Historic Places in Eau Claire County, Wisconsin